The Meu is an  long river in the Côtes-d'Armor and Ille-et-Vilaine départements, north western France. It flows generally southeast.

Départements and communes along its course
This list is ordered from source to mouth:
 Côtes-d'Armor: Saint-Vran, Mérillac, Merdrignac, Saint-Launeuc, Trémorel, Loscouët-sur-Meu
 Ille-et-Vilaine: Gaël, Muel, Bléruais, Saint-Maugan, Saint-Gonlay, Iffendic, Montfort-sur-Meu, Breteil, Talensac, Cintré, Mordelles, Bréal-sous-Montfort, Chavagne, Goven

References

Rivers of France
Rivers of Brittany
Rivers of Côtes-d'Armor
Rivers of Ille-et-Vilaine